Sweden competed at the 2015 World Aquatics Championships in Kazan, Russia from 24 July to 9 August 2015.

Medalists

Diving

Swedish divers qualified for the individual spots at the World Championships.

Men

Women

Open water swimming

Sweden has qualified one open water swimmer.

Swimming

Swedish swimmers have achieved qualifying standards in the following events (up to a maximum of 2 swimmers in each event at the A-standard entry time, and 1 at the B-standard):

Men

Women

Mixed

References

External links
Swedish Swimming Association

Nations at the 2015 World Aquatics Championships
2015 in Swedish sport
Sweden at the World Aquatics Championships